MENC may refer to:
 National Association for Music Education, formerly known as the Music Educators National Conference
 O-succinylbenzoate synthase, an enzyme
 Methyl isocyanide, an organic compound